Pedro da Conceição (died 10 April 1960) is a former Portuguese footballer who played as a goalkeeper.

He represented Benfica during the 1930s, winning a Lisbon Championship.

Career
Conceição joined Benfica in 1931, making his debut on 10 January 1932, against União de Lisboa. He played all of the team games in 1931–32, but did not win any silverware. He remained an undisputed starter in 1932–33, playing 19 games as Benfica won the Campeonato de Lisboa. The next season, Conceição competed with Augusto Amaro, appearing in four games against his competitor eight. However, all of his games were in the Campeonato de Portugal, while Amaro played seven in the Campeonato de Lisboa.

In 1934–35, he definitely overtaken by Amaro in the pecking order, appearing only once throughout the season. After the breakthrough of Cândido Tavares in 1935–36, he only played in the regional league and left the club at the end of the season with 48 games played.

Honours
Benfica
Campeonato de Lisboa: 1932–33

References
General
 

Specific

Year of birth unknown
1960 deaths
Portuguese footballers
Association football goalkeepers
Primeira Liga players
S.L. Benfica footballers